Sergey Grinevich (born 25 February 1960, in Grodno) is a Belarusian painter.

Biography
Grinevich was born in 1960 in the Byelorussian Soviet Socialist Republic near Grodno. From 1971 to 1978 he was a student in the city's Republican school of Fine Art. In 1978 he began his studies at the Belarusian State Academy of Arts (Department of monumental painting), where he graduated in 1983. He has taken part in art exhibitions since 1982.

Work
Sergey Grinevich is now one of the most influential artists in Belarus. Together with Juri Jacovenko, Valentina Choba, Vladimir Panteleev and Victoria Iliyna, he is a member of an artist group there. 

 Artist about himself: I have painted all my life and, oddly enough, with every year there appear more and more mysteries in this profession for me. Perhaps this permanent intrigue, and the desire to get closer to the unknown keeps me in the profession, which in the great scheme of things is not actually a profession, but my life choice ...

Notable exhibitions (group and solo)

2019
 Beijing International Art Biennale,  China.

Literature 
 Friedrich Kisters: Sergey Grinevich Blick und Richtung, published in Switzerland by Human Bios GmbH, Kreuzlingen (2013) Language: German ;  Hardcover: 200 pages

References

External links
 Сергей Гриневич. Художник - монументалист, Беларусь.
 Sergey Grinevich, www.artkurator.com
 Sergey Grinevich, www.art-goldendin.com

1960 births
Living people
Belarusian painters
Modern painters